Gangarampur Stadium is a Stadium located beside the State Highway 10 near Kaldighi in Gangarampur, West Bengal. The stadium was built in early twenty first century.

References

Gangarampur
Multi-purpose stadiums in India
2001 establishments in West Bengal
Cricket grounds in West Bengal
Sports venues completed in 2001